Stoke Rochford Hall is a large house built in scenic grounds, with a nearby golf course, next to the A1 in south Lincolnshire, England.

The parkland and gardens of Stoke Rochford Hall are listed Grade II* on the Register of Historic Parks and Gardens.

History
The remains of a Roman villa and bath house were identified by William Stukeley in 1739 and again in 1824 and 1960. No substantive ruins are preserved.

The Neville family had a house on the site in the 14th century.  The estate passed to the Rochfords in the 15th century, whence comes the name of the estate, and to the Coneys in the 16th century.  The estate was purchased by Sir Edmund Turnor around the time he was knighted in 1663. The grand house he began building in 1665 was demolished in 1774. In 1794 the Turnors built a smaller house at Stoke that was replaced by the current structure in the 1840s. The estate was occupied by Harry Wyndham Jefferson and his wife Gwendolen Mary Talbot at the beginning of the 20th century.

The present building dating from 1843 was designed by architect William Burn, for Christopher Turnor. For the rest of the 19th century and early 20th century it was owned by the Turnor family. Christopher Turnor's grandson sold  of the Wragby estate in 1917. He started holding summer conferences at the hall. In August 1940, the estate was taken over by his first cousin, Major Herbert Broke Turnor.

In 1940 the house was requisitioned by the War Office, and used for a variety of purposes. It became the headquarters of the Second Battalion, the Parachute Regiment. The ill-fated 1944 Arnhem 'drop' was planned in the library at Stoke Rochford.

The house was purchased from the War Office by Kesteven County Council in 1948 and became home to Kesteven College of Education, a teacher-training college that closed in 1978. It retained a connection with education, as the training and conference centre of the National Union of Teachers. It was not solely used by the NUT, but also by national organisations and companies for conferences or seminars because of its situation close to the A1 and Grantham railway station. On 25 January 2005 a fire gutted the interior of the hall. It was restored by English Heritage over three years at a cost of £12m.

The hall has banqueting facilities, a sports club and a restaurant, and is used for wedding receptions and parties.  
In 2016 it was sold to Talash Hotels Group.
On 17 April 2018, Stoke Rochford Hall joined Best Western Hotels and Resorts in Great Britain as part of its BW Premier Collection.

Architectural style

The hall is built in a Jacobean style, with many chimneys. It was designed by William Burn, who also laid out the gardens in collaboration with William Andrews Nesfield. The gate lodge, also in a Jacobean style, was designed in 1834 by Cornelius Sherborne.

The front elevation of the Elizabethan stables was re-erected and the stone frontispieces still stand in the park. This carries the dates 1676 and 1704, representing their original erection and re-building.

Golf
A golf course was laid out in 1924 by Christopher Turnor. It is still in use and is home to Stoke Rochford golf club.

See also
 Stoke Rochford

References

External links
 
 Former Kesteven College
 Britannia Tours
 January 2009 Lincolnshire Life article about the Hall's restoration

Video links

 On bridge overlooking lake video. Retrieved 18 December 2010

News items
 East Midlands Today September 2008
 Fire in January 2005

Exhibition and conference centres in England
Grade I listed buildings in Lincolnshire
Grade I listed houses
Grade II* listed parks and gardens in Lincolnshire
Hotels in Lincolnshire
Houses completed in the 19th century
National Union of Teachers
South Kesteven District